The 3rd Mirchi Music Awards, presented by Radio Mirchi, honored the best of Hindi music from the year 2010. The ceremony was held on 27 January 2011 at the Bandra Kurla Complex, Mumbai, and was hosted by Shaan and Sonu Nigam. The program featured many performances, including those by Bappi Lahiri, Usha Uthup, DJ Lloyd, Akshay Kumar, Anushka Sharma, Rishi Kapoor and Priyanka Chopra. Several award categories were introduced for the first time, including Best Indipop Song, Best Item Number, Best Raag Inspired Song, Best song in Sufi Tradition, and Best Album of Golden Era. Dabangg won a leading eight awards including Album of the Year and Song of the Year for "Munni Badnaam".

The First Mirchi Music awards was held on 2009 and was hosted by Radio Mirchi 98.3 FM.

Winners and nominees 

The winners were selected by the members of a jury, chaired by Javed Akhtar. The following are the names of nominees and winners.

(Winners are listed first, highlighted in boldface.)

Film awards

Technical awards

Non-film awards

Special awards

Listeners' Choice awards

Jury awards

Films with multiple wins and nominations

Jury 
The jury was chaired by Javed Akhtar. Other members were:

 Aadesh Shrivastava - music composer and singer
 Alka Yagnik - playback singer
 Anu Malik - music director
 Lalit Pandit - composer
 Kailash Kher - singer
 Kavita Krishnamurthy - playback singer
 Louis Banks - composer, record producer and singer
 Prasoon Joshi - lyricist and screenwriter
 Rakeysh Omprakash Mehra - filmmaker and screenwriter
 Ramesh Sippy - director and producer
 Sadhana Sargam - playback singer
 Shankar Mahadevan - composer and playback singer
 Subhash Ghai - director, producer and screenwriter
 Suresh Wadkar - playback singer

See also 
 Mirchi Music Awards

References

External links 
 Music Mirchi Awards Official Website
 Music Mirchi Awards 2010

Mirchi Music Awards